Jesús "Chuy" Orlando Enríquez (born August 16, 1997) is an American professional soccer player who plays for USL Championship club Monterey Bay FC.

Career 
Enríquez played with Club Tijuana, playing for the B-team and appearing on the bench for the first-team in 2016, making the bench in games against Club Atlético Zacatepec and Coras de Tepic. He moved to USL side Rio Grande Valley FC Toros on January 18, 2018.

He made his professional debut on 16 March 2018, playing in a 1–1 draw with Saint Louis FC.

In January 2020, Enríquez joined San Antonio FC. Enríquez and San Antonio mutually agreed to part ways on August 21, 2020.

Following his release from San Antonio, Enríquez signed with Reno 1868 on August 28, 2020. Reno folded their team on November 6, 2020, due to the financial impact of the COVID-19 pandemic.

On December 29, 2020, Enríquez joined USL Championship side Oakland Roots ahead of their 2021 season.

On March 17, 2023, Monterey Bay FC announced that Enríquez joined the California team on a one year contract for the 2023 season.

References

External links
 

1997 births
Living people
People from Newark, California
Sportspeople from Alameda County, California
American soccer players
American sportspeople of Mexican descent
Association football forwards
Club Tijuana footballers
Expatriate footballers in Mexico
Rio Grande Valley FC Toros players
Soccer players from California
USL Championship players
San Antonio FC players
Reno 1868 FC players
Oakland Roots SC players
Monterey Bay FC players